Lwalu, also known as Lwalwa, is a Bantu language of the Democratic Republic of the Congo. Its classification is uncertain: Nurse (2003), following Ahmed (1995), assigns all of Guthrie's L.20 languages to Luban, including Lwalu. 

Maho (2009) lists L.22 Mbagani (which has no ISO code) as closely related. Mbagani is also called Binji, and has been confused in the literature with the Binji language. Ethnologue labels the area Maho assigns to Mbagani as Songe.

References

Bantu languages
Languages of the Democratic Republic of the Congo